Roch-Pamphile Vallée (May 28, 1848 – October 9, 1935) was a journalist, newspaper editor and political figure in Quebec. He represented Portneuf in the House of Commons of Canada from 1878 to 1882 as a Conservative member.

He was born in Montmagny, Canada East, the son of Jean Stanislas Vallée, who took part in the Lower Canada Rebellion, and was educated at St. Anne's College. In 1871, Vallée published an unofficial weekly journal of debates in the Quebec legislative assembly, L'Écho de la session; an official journal of debates appeared in 1877. In 1873, he married Zoë Montmiry. He was editor for Le Courrier du Canada. In the 1877 election for the Quebec legislative assembly, Vallée tied with Alexandre Chauveau in the riding of Rimouski; the returning officer cast the deciding vote in favour of Chauveau. In the 1878 federal election, he was again defeated by the vote of the returning officer; however, a recount gave Vallée the seat by a margin of 33 votes. He ran unsuccessfully for reelection to the House of Commons in 1882 and 1891.

References 
 
The Canadian parliamentary companion and annual register, 1882, CH Mackintosh

1848 births
1935 deaths
Members of the House of Commons of Canada from Quebec
Conservative Party of Canada (1867–1942) MPs